The Colony of Demerara-Essequibo was created on 28 April 1812, when the British combined the colonies of Demerara and Essequibo into the colony of Demerara-Essequibo. They were officially ceded to Britain on 13 August 1814. On 20 November 1815 the agreement was ratified by the Netherlands. On 21 July 1831 Demerara-Esequibo united with Berbice as British Guiana.

Overview
In 1745, Demerara was created as a separate Dutch colony out of a part of Essequibo. Demerara quickly became more successful than Essequibo. The rivalry between the colonies resulted in the creation of a combined Court of Policy in Fort Zeelandia in 1783, and both colonies were governed by the same governor, however there were still two Courts of Justice, one for Demerara and one for Essequibo. On 28 April 1812, the two colonies were officially combined, however 1815 is used as end date, because the ratification eliminated the last legal obstacles.

On 18 August 1823, there was a slave rebellion involving more than 10,000 slaves, which resulted in the deaths of hundreds of slaves.

On 21 July 1831 Demerara-Esequibo united with Berbice as British Guiana.

The colony continued to use Dutch denominations of currency even though under British control. The issued coins ranging from 3 bits up to 3 Guilder. These coins were minted with the colonies name on it, and were minted from 1809 to 1835. The dollar was introduced in 1839.

Administrators

Lieutenant Governors

John Murray (1814–1824)
Sir Benjamin d'Urban (1824–1831)

See also
Demerara rebellion of 1823

References

Bibliography

History of Guyana
Former British colonies and protectorates in the Americas
1812 establishments in the British Empire